Sorubi is a community in the southern corner of Rodat District, Nangarhar Province, Afghanistan.

The New York Times reports that one of the leaders of the Eastern Shura,
a provisional government set up in Nangarhar Province on November 16, 2001, after the Taliban retreated, was the leader of an anti-Taliban militia, from Sorubi, named Ezatullah.

See also 
Nangarhar Province

References

Populated places in Nangarhar Province